Quasar (Wendell Elvis Vaughn) is a fictional superhero appearing in American comic books published by Marvel Comics. He is one of Marvel's cosmic heroes, a character whose adventures frequently take him into outer space or other dimensions. However, Quasar deviates from the archetype of the noble, dauntless alien set by such Silver Age cosmic heroes as the Silver Surfer, Adam Warlock and Captain Marvel (Mar-Vell) in that he is an everyman. He starred in an eponymous monthly ongoing series written by Mark Gruenwald that ran for sixty issues beginning in 1989 and has served as a member of The Avengers.

Publication history
The character first appeared as Marvel Boy in Captain America #217 (Jan. 1978). He continued to make guest appearances in Captain America, The Incredible Hulk, Marvel Two-in-One, and The Avengers. He was revamped as Quasar by Mark Gruenwald, and first appeared under this new name in The Incredible Hulk vol. 2 #234 (April 1979).

Quasar received an eponymous series in October 1989, written by Mark Gruenwald and illustrated by Paul Ryan and Danny Bulanadi. The title crossed over with Infinity Gauntlet, Operation: Galactic Storm, and The Infinity War.

Later, the New Universe's Star Brand was introduced into the Marvel Universe.  Its presence precipitated into the "Starblast" storyline, which was intended to stir up interest in Quasar's solo series or a prospective cosmic team series starring Quasar, but it failed to do so. Quasar was cancelled at issue #60.

He would appear sporadically over the next several years. The character appeared in the 1996 Star Masters miniseries (as well as Cosmic Powers Unlimited & Silver Surfer vol 3 #123) as part of a team of cosmic heroes with the Silver Surfer and Beta Ray Bill. He also appeared in the Avengers: Infinity miniseries, Maximum Security (2000), and Fantastic Four #521-524 (2006).

Quasar appeared and died in the four-issue mini-series Annihilation: Nova (June-Sept. 2006). He appeared as a spirit in Annihilation: Conquest: Quasar #1-4 (Sept.-Dec. 2007), by writer Christos Gage and penciller Mike Lilly. An astral form of Quasar had a recurring role in Nova vol 4 beginning with issue #17, as the writers Dan Abnett and Andy Lanning (known collectively as DnA) thought he was too useful a character to stay dead:

The character regained a physical form in the Realm of Kings one-shot (2009) and played a role in The Thanos Imperative (2010). Quasar assumed the leadership role of the titular team in Annihilators #1-4 (2011) and Annihilators: Earthfall (2011).

Fictional character biography

Origin and early career
Wendell Vaughn was born in Fond du Lac, Wisconsin. He graduated from S.H.I.E.L.D. Academy. Although considered highly capable by his superiors, they nonetheless deem him unfit for field work, sensing that Vaughn lacked the necessary "killer instinct"—the will to win at all costs.

His first assignment is security detail for a research facility where a team of scientists were performing experiments on the Quantum Bands taken from the deceased Crusader. A test pilot selected to wear the bands proves spectacularly successful at wielding them, but he perishes when the energy output reaches a critical mass beyond his control. Vaughn dons the bands when the criminal scientists A.I.M. launch a full-scale assault on the facility. Using the bands' power to generate solid energy constructs, he repulses the attack. When the energy buildup begins to overwhelm him, he decides to simply relax and "go with the flow". To his surprise, the buildup abruptly dissipates. Vaughn realizes the key to wielding the bands is a flexible will, rather than an indomitable, uncompromising one. Ultimately, his lack of a killer instinct makes him a more suitable wielder of the bands.

Wendell Vaughn becomes a superhero, using the codename Marvel Boy in his first appearance alongside S.H.I.E.L.D.'s superhuman Super-Agents. He later becomes Marvel Man, and finally settles on Quasar.

Alongside Captain America, the Falcon, and Hulk, he battles Moonstone and the Corporation. Later, as security chief of Project: Pegasus, he battles the original Deathlok, Nuklo, the Grapplers, and the Nth Man when they attack the facility. Quasar later journeys with the Thing into an alternate reality. His mind is temporarily taken over by the Serpent Crown.

Protector of the Universe
Quasar journeys to Uranus, where the original Marvel Boy had received the bands. The bands' true nature and origins are revealed to him by the cosmic entity called Eon. Eon explains the bands were intended to be worn by his agent, the Protector of the Universe (previously the late Captain Mar-Vell). Quasar is offered the role and accepts. As a result, his mind is opened to the true extent of the bands' power, including how to use the bands to teleport via a dimension called the Quantum Zone. He also battles Deathurge. After returning to Earth, he resumes his role as a superhero and assists the Avengers in battle against Super-Nova. He is inducted into the Avengers shortly after.

Quasar meets Uatu the Watcher. He encounters the Stranger, and solves the Watcher's "Oblivion Plague".

After a falling-out with both his estranged father and Eon, he quits his role as Protector of the Universe. During this time Maelstrom, the "Cosmic Assassin", kills both Quasar and Eon. However, Quasar is recreated in an energy form by the cosmic being Infinity and battles Maelstrom and Oblivion. Quasar saves the universe from collapse. Maelstrom is destroyed by the Quantum-bands and Quasar resurrects himself. Quasar fights Thanos at Eon's funeral. Eon is reincarnated in the form of its newborn offspring Epoch.

When a stargate being used by the Shi'ar during the Kree-Shi'ar War threatens to destroy Earth's sun, Quasar is able to undo the damage with the help of Binary.

During the 1992 storyline "Infinity War", Quasar travels to the Dimension of Manifestations to gather intelligence. With the aid of the Contemplator, he discovers the cosmic being Eternity in a catatonic state. He leaves the dimension to join with his fellow superheroes. Quasar attempts to use the near-omnipotent Ultimate Nullifier against the god-like villain Magus, but Magus uses the Infinity Gauntlet to turn the weapon against Quasar, wiping him from existence.

He is briefly replaced by a supervillain who claims his Quantum Bands for himself but Quasar is able to resurrect himself through means of the Star Brand, which he had acquired during a trip to the New Universe prior to the Infinity War. He saves the Living Tribunal from power-hungry Deviant Ereshkigal and stops Skeletron and The Black Fleet from acquiring the Star Brand for themselves. When the Presence threatens to kill his loved ones, Quasar fakes his death and leaves Earth.

Avengers Deep-Space/Annihilation
Quasar helps defend the universe from aliens called Infinites. When Earth is threatened by Ego the Living Planet, Quasar absorbs Ego's essence and exiles himself into space, for fear of Ego expanding to planet-size.

Quasar helps to operate an Avengers deep-space sensing station with the support of Living Lightning and Monica Rambeau, and then becomes involved in Kang's War. He later assists the Fantastic Four in a battle with Galactus. When the Annihilation Wave strikes, Quasar and Nova try to stop it. Quasar is killed by Annihilus.

Wendell is restored to life in a Quantum Energy form thanks to the scientists of Project Pegasus.

Realm of Kings
Wendell volunteers to scout the rip in spacetime that occurs during the 2009 "War of Kings" storyline. During the trip, he regains physical form and discovers an alternate universe planning to invade his universe.  Trying to return to his reality, Quasar encounters an Imperial Guard exploration ship. Quasar joins Nova's team to resist the invasion.

In an effort to prevent further galactic catastrophes, Quasar joins the Annihilators.<ref>The Thanos Imperative: Devastation (Jan 2011), Marvel Comics.</ref> The team protects Galador from an invasion of the Dire Wraiths and brings an end to the generations long war between the two worlds. The Annihilators learn of an attempt to revive the Magus by the Universal Church of Truth, and they prevent his resurrection with the aid of the Avengers. Quasar and the other Annihilators later confront Thanos and Adam Warlock while the two are on a cosmic crusade, and are defeated.

Pleasant Hill
During the Avengers: Standoff! storyline, Vaughn begins to lose control of the Quantum Bands and willingly allows his memories and appearance to be altered by Kobik in Pleasant Hill, a secret S.H.I.E.L.D. prison disguised as a gated community run by Maria Hill, who poses as its mayor. During this time, he works as the curator of the Pleasant Hill museum. When Wendell's memories are restored during Baron Helmut Zemo's prison revolt, he bequeaths the Quantum Bands to a young S.H.I.E.L.D. agent named Avril Kincaid and agrees to mentor her so she can become the next Quasar.

Powers and abilities
Wendell Vaughn is an athletic man with no inherent superhuman powers. He received extensive training in hand-to-hand combat, and moderate experience in the same. He is an expert in all basic espionage skills, as a S.H.I.E.L.D. Academy graduate.

Quantum Bands

Star Brand
While he possessed the power of the Star Brand, Quasar gained the abilities of flight, superhuman strength and resilience. He also was able to regenerate his entire body from minute remains and did not need to eat, drink or breathe. However, virtually all of the energy derived from the Star Brand was depleted not long after he gave it away. The Living Tribunal later stated that Quasar's body retains only an insignificant trace amount of energy.

Cosmic awareness
Quasar also briefly possessed the same powers of cosmic awareness that Eon granted to Kree soldier Mar-Vell (later known as the original Captain Marvel). By simply concentrating for a moment, he could gain complete knowledge about virtually anything in the universe.

Standard Operating Procedure
While Quasar's powers are quite powerful and diverse, since he doesn't make it a habit of using all of his power to destroy his opponent, it is important to note his standard operating procedure:
 Contain. Quasar encounters someone who looks menacing. Immediate reaction: whip up a containment vessel around him to prevent further danger.
 Drain. If it appears this menace has energy-based powers, Quasar taps those powers and drains them off. The length of time this takes depends on the extent of the menace's power. He cannot do this to persons whose energies are outside the electromagnetic spectrum.
 Attack. Clobber the guy with a quantum-construct, be it a personal weapon (Quasar prefers nunchakus) or something big like a giant hammer or anvil.

Reception
 In 2012, Quasar was ranked 36th in IGN's list of "The Top 50 Avengers".
 In 2018, CBR.com ranked Quasar (Wendell Vaughn) 7th in their "25 Fastest Characters In The Marvel Universe" list.

Other versions

Captain Universe Quasar

After a failed war with the Elder God Set and the deaths of every hero on Earth save the Silver Surfer, Quasar is merged with Captain Universe to form a super-being capable of capturing and defeating Set. Using the Eye of Agamotto, Quasar traps himself and Set within its pocket dimension.

Once, during a trip through alternate realities, the Earth-616 version of Quasar viewed his Captain Universe-enhanced counterpart and Set battling each other.

Guardians of the Galaxy

Tricked by Eon's evil "child" Era, Quasar jumps to a sentient nexus of energy and is killed. He ends up in the 'White Room', where all Quantum Band wielders go after death. Eon is entrapped with him, in the form of a centerpiece on the Room's table.

Her, now called Kismet, teams up with the long-lost son she had with Quasar, Starhawk. They visit Quasar's grave and learn what Era has done. With the aid of the Hawk-God Starhawk worships, the two vow to stop Era.

House of M Quasar

Wendell Vaughn briefly appears as a scientist in the alternate timeline. There is no indication that he possesses the quantum bands in this universe.

Last Avengers Story

Quasar is briefly mentioned as having gone insane in Last Avengers Story #1, but does not appear.

Marvel Zombies
In Marvel Zombies: Dead Days #1, Quasar is one of the heroes attending the briefing given by Nick Fury about defending their world from the zombie plague. A zombified Quasar is featured in the 2009 limited series Marvel Zombies Return, part of a super-powered zombie force including the Super-Skrull, Namor, Moon Knight, and Thundra. The group destroys many of the somewhat heroic zombies featured in Marvel Zombies 2. Quasar murders his reality's human Kitty Pryde, holding her underwater until she is forced to turn solid, upon which it is implied that Namor eats her. Quasar and his zombie cohorts are killed at the end of the series.

Ultimate Marvel
S.H.I.E.L.D. agent Wendell Vaughn is the head of security for the top secret Project Pegasus in Devil's Point, Wyoming. He first appears in Ultimate Power'' #1, when Project Pegasus is attacked by the Serpent Squad.

Collected editions

References

External links
 Quasar (Wendell Vaughn) at the Marvel Universe

1989 comics debuts
Avengers (comics) characters
Characters created by John Buscema
Characters created by Roy Thomas
Comics characters introduced in 1978
Fictional characters from Wisconsin
Fictional secret agents and spies
Guardians of the Galaxy characters
Marvel Comics characters who can teleport
Marvel Comics male superheroes
Marvel Comics titles
S.H.I.E.L.D. agents

fr:Quasar (comics)